Acacia ataxiphylla, commonly known as the large-fruited Tammin wattle, is a shrub belonging to the genus Acacia. It is native to  Western Australia.

Phyllodes are continuous with branchlets but without forming cauline wings. They are narrowly linear and straight to shallowly curved or shallowly sigmoid in shape.

It produces white-cream flowers from June to January. They have hairy heads globular to slightly obloid containing 15 to 20 flowers.

The shrub grows in sand, gravel, clay or loam, and has a disjunct scattered population through the Wheatbelt and Great Southern regions of Western Australia. It grows over laterite in low heath, shrub mallee and low Eucalyptus woodlands.
 
Two varieties are recognized:
Acacia ataxiphylla var. ataxiphylla
Acacia ataxiphylla var. muricata

See also
List of Acacia species

References

ataxiphylla
Acacias of Western Australia
Plants described in 1855
Taxa named by George Bentham